Horst Dassler (12 March 1936 – 9 April 1987) was a German businessman. The son of Adolf "Adi" Dassler, founder of Adidas. Horst Dassler founded Arena, a swimwear company, and became chairman of Adidas, and at the time of his death it was the world's largest sporting goods manufacturer with affiliates in 40 nations. Horst himself was known as the father of sports sponsorship as a result of his separate business of managing rights for the world governing bodies of football and the Olympics.

Horst was also the nephew of Rudolf Dassler, founder of Puma.

Career at Adidas
Dassler joined his father's firm in 1960 and founded an Adidas affiliate in Alsace that later became the dominant sporting goods manufacturer in France. Among Dassler's achievements was the founding of the Arena line of swimwear in 1973. Dassler had been impressed by the performance of Mark Spitz at the 1972 Munich Olympics. Having developed an ultra-light fabric, Dassler persuaded Australian swimmer Shane Gould to enter a sponsorship agreement to promote the Shane Gould Female Swimsuit Collection. Dassler continued to sign athletes to sponsorship deals and by the 1976 Montreal Olympics the "Arena Elite Team" included Mark Spitz, Novella Calligaris, Steve Furniss, David Wilkie, Shirley Babashoff, Gary Hall Sr., Klaus Dibiasi, Ulrika Knape and Maxine “Miki” King. Beyond signing individual athletes, Dassler led Adidas's pioneering drive to sign national sports federations and Olympic committees to exclusive shoe and apparel contracts. Although Adidas lost considerable share of this business after Dassler's death, even five years later Adidas had ties with about 100 companies.

After the death of his father in 1978, Dassler's mother Käthe Dassler became chairman of the company and Dassler returned to Germany to take his place in the top management of the firm. When his mother died in 1984, Dassler assumed the office of chairman, a position he retained until his death.

On assuming control, Dassler was immediately faced with the challenge of increasing competition for sports shoeware: Nike, Inc. was eroding Adidas's market share in the United States and Japan, and Puma SE, a company founded by Dassler's uncle after a dispute with his father, had increased its sales of athletic footwear by 35% the previous year. Dassler responded to the challenge by installing a professional management team at company headquarters to replace family members. In the United States, where Adidas's sales had slipped to one third of Nike's, Dassler attempted to diversify distribution channels and respond to a shift in consumer demand from athletic to casual footwear, a shift that Adidas had failed to satisfy.

Career as sports marketer
Horst Dassler was known as the father of sport sponsorship. In the mid 1970s Dassler formed arguably the first sports marketing firm with British advertising executive Patrick J. Nally. The two approached newly elected FIFA President João Havelange, who believed that the soccer body was not maximizing revenues. Dassler proposed obtaining corporate sponsorships for the World Cup and other activities of FIFA. It took the two 18 months of high pressure salesmanship to persuade Coca-Cola to become FIFA's first corporate sponsor, committing $8 million. Coca-Cola thus became the first exclusive worldwide sponsor of a sport. Dassler and Nally continued acquiring sponsorships from blue chip companies like McDonald's and Levi Strauss. Dassler's business practices had few limits and David Yallop in his book How they Stole the Game says his relationship with Havelange was "Drahtzieher." Dassler was the "puppetmaster." In the 1982 Dassler broke with Nally and established ISL Marketing A.G. (ISL), a firm which continued marketing FIFA rights but also added television rights to the advertising package which it bought up en masse from FIFA.

In May 1985 ISL was selected to manage the corporate sponsorship program of the International Olympic Committee (IOC). The highly lucrative contract was awarded without competitive bidding, and even without providing the opportunity to Nally's rival marketing company, West Nally, Ltd., to make an alternative proposal. Many suspected that personal relations between Adidas and the IOC was behind the private arrangement. IOC President Juan Antonio Samaranch denied any impropriety, and Dassler, claiming to be motivated solely by good will for the Olympics movement, denied he had a conflict of interest. According to British sports journalists Vyv Simson and Andrew Jennings, Dassler and ISL were largely responsible for turning the Olympics into a hugely successful revenue-generating enterprise. Dassler used his contacts to obtain Olympic sponsorship by Coca-Cola and other important companies and obtained Olympic financing from Monte Carlo banks. Years later, Samaranch was the main eulogist at Dassler's funeral.

Years after Dassler's death, in May 2001 ISL filed for bankruptcy, with a stated net debt of $300 million.

Death
Horst Dassler died on 9 April 1987 from complications due to cancer. He left behind his wife Monika and two children, Suzanne and Adi.

References

1936 births
1987 deaths
Horst
Businesspeople from Bavaria
Adidas people
Recipients of the Olympic Order
People from Erlangen
Deaths from cancer in Germany